Douglas Silva de Andrade (born June 22, 1985) is a Brazilian mixed martial artist who currently competes in Bantamweight division of the Ultimate Fighting Championship (UFC).

Background
Silva de Andrade grew up in Castanhal, Brazil. He has an older sister. He became interested in martial arts in his early teens and continued to train only with his friend long into his professional career.

Mixed martial arts career

Early career
Silva de Andrade began his professional mixed martial arts career in 2007. He competed on the regional circuit in Pará, Brazil, notably for Super Pitbull Fight, Carmen Casca-Grossa Fight, Amazon Fight and Shooto Brazil. He amassed a record of 21–0 with 1 non-contest prior joining UFC.

Ultimate Fighting Championship
Silva de Andrade made his promotional debut on a short notice, replacing injured Thiago Tavares on February 15, 2014 at UFC Fight Night: Machida vs. Mousasi against Zubaira Tukhugov. He lost the fight via unanimous decision.

Silva de Andrade was expected to face Rob Font at UFC 175 in July 2014. However he ceded his place on the card due to injury and was replaced by George Roop.

He next faced Cody Gibson at UFC Fight Night: Bigfoot vs Mir on February 22, 2015. Silva de Andrade rebounded with a victory over Gibson with a unanimous decision.

After 21 months layoff from the recoveries of three surgeries, Silva de Andrade returned to octagon to fight Henry Briones at The Ultimate Fighter Latin America 3 Finale: dos Anjos vs. Ferguson on November 5, 2016.  He knocked out Briones via a spinning backfist and won the fight. He also earned a Performance of the Night bonus.

Silva de Andrade faced Rob Font on July 8, 2017 at UFC 213. He lost the fight via submission in the second round.

Silva de Andrade faced Marlon Vera on February 3, 2018 at UFC Fight Night 125. He won the fight via unanimous decision.

Silva de Andrade was briefly scheduled to meet Petr Yan on September 15, 2018 at the UFC Fight Night 136. However, Andrade pulled out of the fight on August 9 citing a foot injury. The pair was rescheduled to meet on December 29, 2018 at UFC 232. He lost the fight via technical knockout in round two after his corner stopped the fight in between rounds.

Silva de Andrade faced Renan Barão in a featherweight bout on November 16, 2019 at UFC Fight Night 164. He won the fight by unanimous decision.

Silva de Andrade was scheduled to face Movsar Evloev on March 7, 2020 at UFC 249. However, de Andrade withdrew from the bout due to injury and he was replaced by newcomer Jamall Emmers.

Silva de Andrade faced Lerone Murphy on January 20, 2021 at UFC on ESPN 20. He lost the bout via unanimous decision.

Silva de Andrade faced Gaetano Pirrello on October 2, 2021 at UFC Fight Night 193. He won the fight via knockout in round one. This win earned him the Performance of the Night award.

Silva de Andrade faced Sergey Morozov on February 12, 2022 at UFC 271. After a dominant round one from Morozov, Silva de Andrade won the bout via second round technical submission after dropping Morozov multiple times and then choking Morozov unconscious with a rear-naked choke. The bout earned the Fight of the Night bonus award.

Silva de Andrade faced Said Nurmagomedov on July 9, 2022 at UFC on ESPN 39. He lost the fight via unanimous decision.

Silva de Andrade is scheduled to face Cody Stamann on May 13, 2023 at UFC Fight Night 224.

Personal life
Silva de Andrade and his wife Meiriane have a daughter, Eva (born 2021).

Championships and accomplishments

Mixed martial arts
Ultimate Fighting Championship
Performance of the Night (Two times) 
Fight of the Night (One time) 
MMAjunkie.com
2022 February Fight of the Month vs. Sergey Morozov

Mixed martial arts record 

|-
|Loss
|align=center|28–5 (1)
|Said Nurmagomedov
|Decision (unanimous)
|UFC on ESPN: dos Anjos vs. Fiziev
|
|align=center|3
|align=center|5:00
|Las Vegas, Nevada, United States
|
|-
|Win
|align=center|28–4 (1)
|Sergey Morozov
|Technical Submission (rear-naked choke)
|UFC 271
|
|align=center|2
|align=center|3:24
|Houston, Texas, United States
|
|-
|Win
|align=center|27–4 (1)
| Gaetano Pirrello
| KO (punch)
| UFC Fight Night: Santos vs. Walker
| 
| align=center| 1
| align=center| 2:04
| Las Vegas, Nevada, United States
| 
|-
|Loss
|align=center|26–4 (1)
|Lerone Murphy
| Decision (unanimous)
| UFC on ESPN: Chiesa vs. Magny
| 
| align=center|3
| align=center|5:00
|Abu Dhabi, United Arab Emirates
|
|-
|Win
|align=center|26–3 (1)
|Renan Barão
|Decision (unanimous)
|UFC Fight Night: Błachowicz vs. Jacaré 
|
|align=center|3
|align=center|5:00
|São Paulo, Brazil
|
|-
|Loss
|align=center|25–3 (1)
|Petr Yan
|TKO (corner stoppage)
|UFC 232 
|
|align=center|2
|align=center|5:00
|Inglewood, California, United States
|  
|-
|Win
|align=center|25–2 (1)
|Marlon Vera
|Decision (unanimous)
|UFC Fight Night: Machida vs. Anders 
|
|align=center|3
|align=center|5:00
|Belém, Brazil
|
|-
|Loss
|align=center|24–2 (1)
|Rob Font
|Submission (guillotine choke)
|UFC 213 
|
|align=center|2
|align=center|4:36
|Las Vegas, Nevada, United States
|
|-
|Win
|align=center|24–1 (1)
|Henry Briones
|TKO (elbow and spinning back fist)
|The Ultimate Fighter Latin America 3 Finale: dos Anjos vs. Ferguson
|
|align=center|3
|align=center|2:33
|Mexico City, Mexico
|
|-
|Win
|align=center|23–1 (1)
|Cody Gibson
|Decision (unanimous)
|UFC Fight Night: Bigfoot vs. Mir
|
|align=center|3
|align=center|5:00
|Porto Alegre, Brazil
|
|-
|Loss
|align=center|22–1 (1)
|Zubaira Tukhugov
|Decision (unanimous)
|UFC Fight Night: Machida vs. Mousasi
|
|align=center|3
|align=center|5:00
|Jaraguá do Sul, Brazil
|
|-
|Win
|align=center|22–0 (1)
|Tiago Passos
|KO (punch)
|Jungle Fight 63
|
|align=center|1
|align=center|0:25
|Belém, Brazil
|
|-
|Win
|align=center|21–0 (1)
|Fabiano Fernandes
|TKO (punches)
|Jungle Fight 60
|
|align=center|1
|align=center|1:40
|São Paulo, Brazil
|
|-
|Win
|align=center|20–0 (1)
|Luiz Antônio Lobo Gavinho
|TKO (punches)
|Jungle Fight 52
|
|align=center|2
|align=center|2:17
|Belém, Brazil
|
|-
|Win
|align=center|19–0 (1)
|Abenilson Cardoso
|TKO (punches)
|Advangers Fight
|
|align=center|1
|align=center|3:54
|Castanhal, Brazil
|
|-
|Win
|align=center|18–0 (1)
|Felipe Froes
|KO (head kick)
|Shooto: Brazil 30
|
|align=center|3
|align=center|3:49
|Belém, Brazil
|
|-
|Win
|align=center|17–0 (1)
|Eunapio Edson Freitas
|KO (head kick)
|Super Pitbull Fight
|
|align=center| 1
|align=center|3:25
|Castanhal, Brazil
|
|-
|Win
|align=center|16–0 (1)
|Giovane Fernandes
|TKO (punches)
|Amazon Fight 11
|
|align=center|2
|align=center|3:04
|Castanhal, Brazil
|
|-
|Win
|align=center|15–0 (1)
|Neliton José Serrão Furtado
|Decision (unanimous)
|Amazon Fight 10
|
|align=center|3
|align=center|5:00
|Belém, Brazil
|
|-
|Win
|align=center|14–0 (1)
|João Ferreira Jr.
|Decision (split)
|Super Pitbull Fight 28
|
|align=center|3
|align=center|5:00
|Castanhal, Brazil
|
|-
|Win
|align=center|13–0 (1)
|Cleison Cardoso
|KO (punches)
|Super Pitbull Fight
|
|align=center|3
|align=center|4:58
|Castanhal, Brazil
|
|-
|Win
|align=center|12–0 (1)
|Anderson Macaco
|TKO (punches)
|Super Pitbull Fight
|
|align=center|1
|align=center|2:30
|Castanhal, Brazil
|
|-
|Win
|align=center|11–0 (1)
|Antônio Marcos
|TKO (punches)
|Super Pitbull Fight
|
|align=center|1
|align=center|2:39
|Igarapé-Açu, Brazil
|
|-
|Win
|align=center|10–0 (1)
|Marcelo Rodrigues
|KO (knees)
|Carmen Casca-Grossa Fight
|
|align=center|1
|align=center|0:16
|Ananindeua, Brazil
|
|-
|Win
|align=center|9–0 (1)
|Daziel Serafim da Silva Jr.
|TKO (punches)
|Super Pitbull Fight
|
|align=center|3
|align=center|2:17
|Castanhal, Brazil
|
|-
|Win
|align=center|8–0 (1)
|João Ferreira Jr.
|TKO (doctor stoppage)
|Super Pitbull Fight
|
|align=center|1
|align=center|0:27
|Castanhal, Brazil
|
|-
|Win
|align=center|7–0 (1)
|Antônio Carlos Fernandes
|TKO (head kick)
|Super Pitbull Fight
|
|align=center|2
|align=center|1:30
|Castanhal, Brazil
|
|-
|Win
|align=center|6–0 (1)
|Denis Pitbull
|KO (punches)
|Super Pitbull Fight: King of the Ring
|
|align=center|2
|align=center|2:33
|Castanhal, Brazil
|
|-
|Win
|align=center|5–0 (1)
|Denis Pitbull
|KO (knees)
|Super Pitbull Fight: King Champions
|
|align=center|1
|align=center|1:49
|Castanhal, Brazil
|
|-
|Win
|align=center|4–0 (1)
|Junior Teixeira
|TKO (retirement)
|Super Pitbull Fight 10
|
|align=center|3
|align=center|2:30
|Capanema, Brazil
|
|-
|Win
|align=center|3–0 (1)
|Maykson Souza Lima
|Decision (unanimous)
|Super Pitbull Fight 9
|
|align=center|5
|align=center|5:00
|Castanhal, Brazil
|
|-
|Win
|align=center|2–0 (1)
|Jorge Rodrigues
|Submission (rear-naked choke)
|Super Pitbull Fight 3
|
|align=center|1
|align=center|4:57
|Castanhal, Brazil
|
|-
|NC
|align=center|1–0 (1)
|Deivison Francisco Ribeiro
|No Contest (knee to the groin)
|Super Pitbull Fight
|
|align=center|1
|align=center|2:00
|Castanhal, Brazil
|
|-
|Win
|align=center|1–0
|Deivison Francisco Ribeiro
|TKO (corner stoppage)
|Open Fight de Vale Tudo 2
|
|align=center|2
|align=center|4:19
|Castanhal, Brazil
|

See also
 List of current UFC fighters
 List of male mixed martial artists

References

External links
 
 

1985 births
Living people
Brazilian male mixed martial artists
Bantamweight mixed martial artists
Mixed martial artists utilizing boxing
Mixed martial artists utilizing Brazilian jiu-jitsu
Sportspeople from Pará
Ultimate Fighting Championship male fighters
Brazilian practitioners of Brazilian jiu-jitsu
People from Castanhal